Nebria tschatkalica is a species of ground beetle in the Nebriinae subfamily that is endemic to Kyrgyzstan.

References

tschatkalica
Beetles described in 2001
Beetles of Asia
Endemic fauna of Kyrgyzstan